This is a list of tennis players who have represented the Mexico Davis Cup team in an official Davis Cup match. Mexico have taken part in the competition since 1924.

Players

References

Lists of Davis Cup tennis players
Davis Cup